Valle d'Aosta Fromadzo or Vallée d'Aoste Fromadzo is an Italian cow's milk cheese produced in the Aosta Valley, one of the region's specialties. It has a protected designation of origin, or PDO status.

References

External links
Valle d'Aosta Fromadzo

Italian cheeses
Cow's-milk cheeses
Cuisine of Aosta Valley
Italian products with protected designation of origin
Cheeses with designation of origin protected in the European Union